Richard John Lloyd FRSE DLitt (1846-1906) was a British linguist and phoneticist. He researched the acoustics of vowel sounds and articulation, which he deemed “minute phonetics”. His field of work did not become popular until the late 20th century, around 100 years after his original work.

Life
He was born in Liverpool on 14 October 1846, into the well-established family business of Richard Lloyd & Brothers. At first entering the family business, he only attended university later in life, graduating from the University of London in 1875 with a BA.

In 1890 the university awarded him an honorary doctorate (DLitt). In 1897 he was elected a Fellow of the Royal Society of Edinburgh. His proposers were John Gray McKendrick, Alexander Buchan, James Thomson Bottomley and Magnus Maclean. He took a particular interest in Esperanto, and became vice-president of the International Phonetic Association.

Lloyd worked as a customs official and port gauger after he left the university. Lloyd was reported missing on 29 August 1906 while attending an Esperanto Congress in Geneva, and his body was found in the Rhône at Seyssel in France, close to the Swiss border. It was surmised he had fallen in while walking along the river's bank.

His daughter Eirene Theodora married Thomas Jones.

Publications

Northern English: Phonetics, Grammar, Texts

Further reading
 MacMahon, Michael K. C. (1 July 2007). 'The work of Richard John Lloyd (1846–1906) and "the crude system of doctrine which passes at present under the name of Phonetics"'. Historiographia Linguistica. 34 (2): 281–331 doi:10.1075/hl.34.2.05mac

References

1846 births
1906 deaths
Academics from Liverpool
Alumni of the University of London
Linguists from the United Kingdom
Fellows of the Royal Society of Edinburgh